Saugatuck Township is a civil township of Allegan County in the U.S. state of Michigan. The population was 3,443 at the 2020 census, up from 2944 at the 2010 census.

Communities
There are no villages with in the township, but there are two unincorporated communities:
Macks Landing is located at Riverside Drive and 62nd Street near the Kalamazoo River (423753N 0860916W; Elevation: .).
Oxbow is located on Rupprecht Way just north of Saugatuck.

History
In 1837, Oshea Wilder and his sons founded the community named for the southeastern Asia city of Singapore at the mouth of the Kalamazoo River. In 1875, Singapore was abandoned.

The township name was Newark until 1861.

On December 13, 2004, Douglas residents voted to adopt a charter changing the status of the village into a city form of government removing Douglas from the Township.

From 2004 to 2006, Oklahoma billionaire Aubrey McClendon bought  of undeveloped duneland in Saugatuck Township for $39.5 million with plans to build luxury homes, 28 condos, a hotel, a marina, and a golf course. In 2006, the Saugatuck Township Board re-zoned the land, making McClendon unable to build his planned project. The Saugatuck Dunes Coastal Alliance opposes McClendon's plans, citing environmental concerns. In 2009, McClendon sold  of the land in order to alleviate the group's concerns. In March 2010, McClendon sued the township in federal court to overturn the zoning. The township has spent more than $250,000 fighting the lawsuit, and has raised taxes in the township in order to raise revenue.

Geography

Demographics

As of the census of 2000, there were 3,590 people, 1,581 households, and 937 families residing in the township. The racial makeup of the township was 96.43% White, 0.42% African American, 0.31% Native American, 0.22% Asian, 0.03% Pacific Islander, 1.25% from other races, and 1.34% from two or more races. Hispanic or Latino of any race were 4.12% of the population.

There were 1,581 households, out of which 24.7% had children under the age of 18 living with them, 48.1% were married couples living together, 8.2% had a female householder with no husband present, and 40.7% were non-families. 33.3% of all households were made up of individuals, and 13.6% had someone living alone who was 65 years of age or older. The average household size was 2.20 and the average family size was 2.82.

In the township the population was spread out, with 20.8% under the age of 18, 4.6% from 18 to 24, 26.3% from 25 to 44, 30.6% from 45 to 64, and 17.8% who were 65 years of age or older. The median age was 44 years. For every 100 females, there were 97.5 males. For every 100 females age 18 and over, there were 97.0 males.

The median income for a household in the township was $43,771, and the median income for a family was $49,600. Males had a median income of $37,845 versus $30,543 for females. The per capita income for the township was $30,056. About 5.4% of families and 7.9% of the population were below the poverty line, including 10.4% of those under age 18 and 4.6% of those age 65 or over.

References

External links 
 Saugatuck Township official website

Townships in Allegan County, Michigan
Townships in Michigan